The University of Cincinnati College of Law was founded in 1833 as the Cincinnati Law School. It is the fourth oldest continuously running law school in the United States — after Harvard, the University of Virginia, and Yale — and the first in the nation's interior. It played an important part in training the lawyers and judges who populated the Midwest in the 19th century.

In 1900, it was a charter member of the Association of American Law Schools. Then-dean (and future 27th President of the United States) William Howard Taft (1880) merged it with the University of Cincinnati in 1896. Its notable alumni include two U.S. Supreme Court justices, Willis Van Devanter and Taft, who was Chief Justice of the Supreme Court after his presidency. Additionally, Jimmy Nippert, the namesake of the university's Nippert Stadium, was a student at UC Law at the time of his death in 1923. 

UC Law offers a JD program as well as an LLM (Master of Laws) in the US Legal System for international attorneys. Graduate certificates in US Law are also available.
U.S. News & World Report, listed Cincinnati's tax law program as 63rd in the nation in 2021.

Deans of the College of Law 

*Acting
**Interim

Publications 

UC Law is home to several journals including the Human Rights Quarterly, University of Cincinnati Law Review, the Immigration and Nationality Law Review, and The Freedom Center Journal (FCJ), a joint publication between the law school and the National Underground Railroad Freedom Center.

Location 
Until August 2022, the College of Law was located at the corner of Clifton Avenue and Calhoun Street in the Heights neighborhood of Cincinnati.

Since August 2022, the College of Law has been located in a new building on the corner of Martin Luther King Drive W and Campus Green Dr. The new premises were named the 11th best law school campus in the country by preLaw Magazine.

Notable alumni

Employment 
According to University of Cincinnati's 2013 ABA-required disclosures, 53% of the Class of 2013 obtained full-time, long-term, JD-required employment nine months after graduation.

References

External links 
University of Cincinnati College of Law

Law, College of
Law schools in Ohio
Educational institutions established in 1833
 
1833 establishments in Ohio